Eubela monile is an extinct species of sea snail, a marine gastropod mollusk in the family Raphitomidae.

Description

Distribution
Fossils of this species were found in New Zealand.

References

 Marwick J. 1931: The Tertiary Mollusca of the Gisborne District N.Z.; Geological Survey Palaeontological Bulletin 13, 177 p.
 Powell, A. W. B., 1966. The molluscan families Speightiidae and Turridae, an evaluation of the valid taxa, both Recent and fossil, with list of characteristic species. Bulletin of the Auckland Institute and Museum, 5:1-184
 Maxwell, P.A. (2009). Cenozoic Mollusca. pp 232–254 in Gordon, D.P. (ed.) New Zealand inventory of biodiversity. Volume one. Kingdom Animalia: Radiata, Lophotrochozoa, Deuterostomia. Canterbury University Press, Christchurch.

monile
Gastropods described in 1931